Koolywurtie may refer to.

The Anglicised version of the local aboriginal name for the headland of Black Point (South Australia)
Hundred of Koolywurtie, a cadastral unit in Australia.
Koolywurtie, South Australia, a locality in the Yorke Peninsula Council